Falconi is the surname of the following people
Armando Falconi (1871–1954), Italian stage and film actor
Carlo Falconi (1915–1998), Italian journalist and writer
Enrique Falconí Mejía, Peruvian politician in the late 1970s
Fander Falconí (born 1962), Ecuadorian economist and politician
Francesco Falconi (born 1976), Italian fantasy writer
Irina Falconi (born 1990), American tennis player
Juan Falconí Puig, Ecuadorian jurist, politician, businessman and writer
María Inés Falconi (born 1954), Argentine writer and theatre director 
Mario Falconi, Italian Roman Catholic priest
Pedro de Oviedo Falconi (died 1649), Roman Catholic prelate 
Ricardo Falconi (born 1962), Chilean modern pentathlete
Romina Falconi (born 1985), Italian electropop singer-songwriter

See also
Falcone (disambiguation)